The New Mexico Menace is a football team in the Independent Women's Football League based in Albuquerque, New Mexico. Home games are played at Wilson Stadium on the campus of Albuquerque High School.

After completing three-quarters of their 2009 schedule, their season ended abruptly.  It was determined by team leadership that its should concentrate on the 2010 season.

Season-By-Season

|-
| colspan="6" align="center" | New Mexico Menace (IWFL)
|-
|2008 || 0 || 8 || 0 || 5th Tier I West Pacific Southwest || --
|-
|2009 || 0 || 6 || 0 || 25th Tier II || --
|-
!Totals || 0 || 14 || 0
|colspan="2"|

2009 season schedule

External links
New Mexico Menace official website
IWFL official website

Independent Women's Football League
Sports in Albuquerque, New Mexico
2008 establishments in New Mexico
American football teams established in 2008
American football teams in New Mexico
2009 disestablishments in New Mexico
American football teams disestablished in 2009
Women's sports in New Mexico